Washington Township is the name of fourteen townships in Kansas:

 Washington Township, Anderson County, Kansas
 Washington Township, Brown County, Kansas
 Washington Township, Chautauqua County, Kansas
 Washington Township, Crawford County, Kansas
 Washington Township, Doniphan County, Kansas
 Washington Township, Jackson County, Kansas
 Washington Township, Jewell County, Kansas
 Washington Township, Nemaha County, Kansas
 Washington Township, Republic County, Kansas
 Washington Township, Saline County, Kansas
 Washington Township, Sherman County, Kansas
 Washington Township, Smith County, Kansas
 Washington Township, Wabaunsee County, Kansas
 Washington Township, Washington County, Kansas

See also

Washington Township (disambiguation)

Kansas township disambiguation pages